Grace Episcopal Church is an historic Episcopal parish in Syracuse, New York. The Gothic Revival building was designed by Horatio Nelson White and was built in 1876.  It is located at 819 Madison Avenue near Syracuse University. On March 20, 1973, it was listed on the National Register of Historic Places.

History
The Grace Church parish was founded in 1871.  The current building was constructed in 1876.

Grace Church has a long history of social activism. In the late 1900s, the church baptized and ordained David Pendleton Oakerhater, a Cheyenne warrior and political prisoner.  Oakerhater devoted his life to serving his people and the Episcopal Church.  In 1992, Oakerhater was elevated to sainthood within the Episcopal Church.  Grace Church is a national shrine for Saint Oakerhater - the first Native Episcopal saint.  In 2004, windows were installed in his honor and in 2005, a celebration with Saint Oakerhater's descendants was held at Grace.

In 1957, Grace Church joined with St. Philip's - a historically black Episcopal Church - establishing Grace as one of the first fully integrated Episcopal churches in the nation.

In the 1960s, Grace led the city's churches in its commitment to civil rights.  Grace's activism included providing a home to one of the first Head Start programs, offering training for Peace Corps, and Vista volunteers, and holding meetings of the Congress for Racial Equality (CORE).

In 1974, Betty Bone Scheiss of Grace was ordained three years prior to the Episcopal General Convention's recognition of women priests. She became associate rector.

In 2008, Grace was one of the first diocesan parishes to participate in Central New York Lesbian, Gay, Bisexual and Transgender Pride.

Grace today
Grace Episcopal Church continues to be an active social justice parish in the Episcopal Diocese of Central New York. Its congregation is of the most racially integrated in the nation, and Grace continues to be a welcoming parish to people of all races, ethnicity, theological backgrounds, sexual orientation and gender identity.

See also

List of Registered Historic Places in Onondaga County, New York
Grace Episcopal Church (disambiguation)

References

External links

Episcopal church buildings in New York (state)
Churches on the National Register of Historic Places in New York (state)
Historic American Buildings Survey in New York (state)
Churches completed in 1876
19th-century Episcopal church buildings
Churches in Syracuse, New York
National Register of Historic Places in Syracuse, New York